Herman Ernest III (August 12, 1951 – March 6, 2011), best known as Roscoe, was an American drummer in the New Orleans funk scene, and is best known for his drumming in Dr. John's band the Lower 911 for almost 30 years. "Renowned for his larger-than-life personality Roscoe was both a powerful percussionist and steadfast individual." He played drums on Dr. John's Trippin' Live, released on July 29, 1997, under the Wind-Up record label, which was recorded over a week in London in 1996 at Ronnie Scott's Jazz Club.

Early life and career

In 1971 he was hired as the drummer of King Floyd's new road band the Rhythm Masters. After a split from the singer they renamed the band World Blues and played gigs around New Orleans. Ernest was the primary drummer on the two Allen Toussaint produced Patti LaBelle albums (Nightbirds and  Phoenix), most influentially in his contribution to the beat of "Lady Marmalade". After World Blues dwindled, Ernest formed another club band with Teddy Royal called Cypress. Ernest played for years at the Sea-Saint studios with Allen Toussaint among others. In 2005, before Hurricane Katrina he was working on Nine Lives with Paul Sanchez.

He began recording with Dr. John in the early 1990s, and became a member of the band after the recording of Trippin' Live in 1996. Shortly after that he became the bandleader and remained a key member until his death, providing a "sturdy foundation." "Their rapport, honed over many years together and the result of a profound mutual respect, was obvious in Mr. Ernest’s humorous introductions and commentaries delivered from behind the drum kit. During a set at the 2010 New Orleans Jazz & Heritage Festival presented by Shell, Mr. Ernest provided a play-by-play description of Rebennack’s zombie-like soft-shoe dance in "I Been Hoodooed"."

Although he spent the majority of his time recording, Ernest was active in different areas of the New Orleans community. He was a deputy sheriff for the New Orleans Police Department and dedicated time during Mardi Gras and Thanksgiving to ensure peace was kept throughout the city. He was active in the Baptist Church. He played drums for his mother's church, the Greater Liberty Baptist Church, on Desire Street in New Orleans. He taught drumming techniques to children with Alonzo Bowens Jr. at the Louis Armstrong Summer Jazz Camp.

Ernest died of cancer on March 6, 2011. To honor his commitment to music and the New Orleans culture, the New Orleans Musicians' Clinic started the NOMAF's Herman Ernest Memorial Interfaith Health Screening Initiative, which will screen New Orleans residents, most specifically musicians for head and neck cancer.

Associated acts
Ernest has played with many musicians including, Johnny Adams, Marcia Ball, Billy Branch, Solomon Burke, Josh Charles, Shemekia Copeland, Cowboy Mouth, Jeremy Davenport, Lee Dorsey, Snooks Eaglin, Carol Fran, Grady Gaines, Guitar Shorty, Jools Holland, Etta James, Earl King, Joe Krown, Patti LaBelle, Linda Lewis, Ramsey Lewis, John Mayall, Jimmy McCracklin, Larry McCray, The Meters, Maria Muldaur, Aaron Neville, The Neville Brothers, David "Fathead" Newman, Anders Osborne, Earl Palmer, Maceo Parker, Wardell Quezergue, Herlin Riley, Kermit Ruffins, Paul Sanchez, Irma Thomas, Allen Toussaint, Johnny Vidacovich, Phillip Walker, Carl Weathersby, Junior Wells and Marva Wright.

Discography 
 The End Of the Beginning - Richie Havens (1976)
 Mirage - Richie Havens (1977)
 Peaceful - Al Johnson (1980)
 Released - Patti LaBelle (1980)
 Changes - Etta James (1980)
 Fiyo on the Bayou - The Neville Brothers (1981)
 Experiment in White - Janis Siegel (1982)
 A Change Is Gonna Come - Solomon Burke (1986)
 Orchid in the Storm - Aaron Neville (1986)
 Louisiana Love Call - Maria Muldaur (1992)
 Soul of the Blues - Solomon Burke (1993)

References

External links

 Allmusic
 Offbeat
 Times Picayune
 
 Vinyl District
 Discography
 Jazz Fest Tribute
 Down on the Bayou III

1951 births
2011 deaths
American funk drummers
American male drummers
American blues drummers
American rhythm and blues musicians
American music arrangers
American blues singers
American bandleaders
Musicians from New Orleans
Blues musicians from Louisiana
Deaths from cancer
Singers from Louisiana